Andrew Logan "Andy" Linden (April 5, 1922 – February 11, 1987) was an American racecar driver.

Early life and military service
Linden was born on April 5, 1922, in Brownsville, Pennsylvania. He served in the United States Navy, where he was a standout boxer, and the National Guard. He also rode hot rods in Los Angeles, California.

Career
He raced with great success until a 1957 crash caused a piece of metal to break his helmet, causing career ending brain damage. He is also technically a former Formula One World Championship driver, as the Indianapolis 500 was part of the FIA World Championship from 1950 through 1960, meaning that drivers competing at Indy during those years were credited with World Championship points and participation. Linden thus participated in 7 World Championship races, accumulating a total of 5 championship points.

in 2013, he was inducted into the National Sprint Car Hall of Fame.

He died in Harbor City, California, on February 11, 1987, and is buried at Inglewood Park Cemetery in Inglewood.

Indy 500 results

References

1922 births
1987 deaths
Burials in California
Indianapolis 500 drivers
AAA Championship Car drivers
National Guard (United States) personnel
People from Brownsville, Pennsylvania
Racing drivers from Pennsylvania
United States Navy sailors